State Route 184 (abbreviated SR 184) is a  long highway in West Tennessee, running between the cities of Troy and Union City.

Route description
SR 184 begins at Troy as a rural two-lane secondary highway at an intersection with SR 21 and continues parallel to the US 51/SR 3 expressway for its first . At this point, SR 184 changes to SR 214 which continues north along the Kenn-Tenn Highway. SR 184 is unsigned from its junction with US 51 to its northern terminus at SR 22.

History
SR 184 from Troy, Tennessee to Union City, Tennessee represents the old two-lane alignment of US 51 & SR 3.

Major intersections

References

184
Transportation in Obion County, Tennessee
U.S. Route 51